Zoran Janković (January 8, 1940 in Zenica, Kingdom of Yugoslavia – May 25, 2002 in Belgrade, FR Yugoslavia) was a Yugoslav water polo player notable for winning a silver medal at the 1964 Summer Olympics in Tokyo, and a gold medal in Mexico City in 1968, with the Yugoslavian men's water polo team.

In his career, he played for the Mladost from Zagreb and Partizan from Belgrade.

See also
 Yugoslavia men's Olympic water polo team records and statistics
 List of Olympic champions in men's water polo
 List of Olympic medalists in water polo (men)
 List of men's Olympic water polo tournament top goalscorers
 List of World Aquatics Championships medalists in water polo
 List of members of the International Swimming Hall of Fame

References
 Večernji List - Sport (Croatian)

External links
 

1940 births
2002 deaths
Yugoslav male water polo players
Serbs of Bosnia and Herzegovina
Bosnia and Herzegovina male water polo players
Olympic water polo players of Yugoslavia
Olympic gold medalists for Yugoslavia
Olympic silver medalists for Yugoslavia
Water polo players at the 1964 Summer Olympics
Water polo players at the 1968 Summer Olympics
Water polo players at the 1972 Summer Olympics
Sportspeople from Zenica
Olympic medalists in water polo
Medalists at the 1968 Summer Olympics
Medalists at the 1964 Summer Olympics